USS R-17 (SS-94) was an R-class coastal and harbor defense submarine of the United States Navy.

Construction and commissioning
R-17′s keel was laid down by the Union Iron Works in San Francisco, California, on 5 May 1917.  She was launched on 24 December 1917 sponsored by Miss Bertha F. Dew, and commissioned on 17 August 1918 with Lieutenant Commander William R. Munroe in command.

Service history

1919–1931
Commissioned toward the end of World War I, R-17 operated briefly off the California coast, then patrolled off the Panama Canal Zone, returning to California in December 1918. In March 1919, she arrived at San Francisco, California, for overhaul, after which she moved west to Pearl Harbor. Departing the West Coast 17 June, she arrived in Hawaii on 25 June and for the next 11½ years operated with fleet units and tested equipment being developed for submarines.

The submarine, given hull classification symbol SS-94 in July 1920, departed Pearl Harbor 12 December 1930, called at San Diego, California, thence continued on to the East Coast for inactivation. Arriving at Philadelphia, Pennsylvania, on 9 February 1931, she was decommissioned 15 May and berthed at League Island until after the outbreak of World War II in Europe.

1941–1946
Recommissioned at New London, 25 March 1941, R-17 headed south on 14 May, patrolled in the Virgin Islands during June; off the Canal Zone in July, August, and September; then, in October, returned to New London. For the next four months she conducted training exercises.

On 9 March 1942, she was decommissioned and transferred to the United Kingdom under the lend-lease agreement. Commissioned in the Royal Navy as HMS P.512, she was employed at Bermuda as a training ship for the Royal Canadian Navy until 6 September 1944 when she was returned to the U.S. Navy at Philadelphia. Retained for use as a target ship until after the end of the war in Europe, R-17 was struck from the Naval Vessel Register on 22 June 1945.  She was sold, 16 November 1945, to the North American Smelting Company in Philadelphia, for scrapping.

References

External links
 

 

R-17 (SS-94)
World War I submarines of the United States
World War II submarines of the United States
Ships built in San Francisco
1917 ships
Ships transferred from the United States Navy to the Royal Navy
United States R-class submarines of the Royal Navy
World War II submarines of the United Kingdom